Taylor Silverholt (born 4 April 2001) is a Swedish football striker who plays for Falkenbergs FF on loan from Mjällby AIF.

References

2001 births
Living people
Swedish footballers
Association football forwards
Mjällby AIF players
Falkenbergs FF players
Ettan Fotboll players
Superettan players
Allsvenskan players